Luppino family  may refer to:
Luppino crime family, an Italian-Canadian crime family
Lupino family, a British theatre family